Donner Memorial State Park is a state park of California, US, preserving the site of the Donner Camp, where members of the ill-fated Donner Party were trapped by weather during the winter of 1846–1847.  Caught without shelter or adequate supplies, members of the group resorted to cannibalism to survive.  The Sierra Nevada site has been designated a National Historic Landmark. The state park contains the Emigrant Trail Museum and the Pioneer Monument dedicated to the travelers of the Emigrant Trail.

Donner Memorial State Park is located outside Truckee, California. The  park was established in 1928.

Visitor center
The Donner Memorial State Park visitor center contains exhibits about the cultural history of the area, including local Native Americans, the Donner Party, and builders of the First transcontinental railroad.  Near the museum is the Pioneer Monument and the Donner Party's Murphy family cabin site.  Park staff offer hikes, special presentations and campfires by the museum.

Pioneer Monument
The Pioneer Monument was erected in honor of all who made the difficult trek across the western plains and mountains to reach California during the 1840s. Work on the monument, constructed near the site of the cabins that gave shelter to the Donner Party, began in 1901. On June 6, 1918, in a ceremony that included Donner Party survivors, the Native Sons of the Golden West donated the completed monument and 11 surrounding acres to the State of California.

The plaque on the front of the Pioneer Statue reads:
VIRILE TO RISK AND FIND; KINDLY WITHAL AND A READY HELP. FACING THE BRUNT OF FATE; INDOMITABLE,—UNAFRAID.

The plaque on the rear of the Pioneer Statue reads:
NEAR THIS SPOT STOOD THE BREEN CABIN OF THE PARTY OF EMIGRANTS WHO STARTED FOR CALIFORNIA FROM SPRINGFIELD, ILLINOIS, IN APRIL 1846, UNDER THE LEADERSHIP OF CAPTAIN GEORGE DONNER. DELAYS OCCURRED AND WHEN THE PARTY REACHED THIS LOCALITY, ON OCTOBER 29, THE TRUCKEE PASS EMIGRANT ROAD WAS CONCEALED BY SNOW. THE HEIGHT OF THE SHAFT OF THE MONUMENT INDICATES THE DEPTH OF THE SNOW, WHICH WAS TWENTY-TWO FEET. AFTER FUTILE EFFORTS TO CROSS THE SUMMIT THE PARTY WAS COMPELLED TO ENCAMP FOR THE WINTER. THE GRAVES CABIN WAS SITUATED ABOUT THREE-QUARTERS OF A MILE TO THE EASTWARD, THE MURPHY CABIN ABOUT TWO HUNDRED YARDS SOUTHWEST OF THE MONUMENT, AND THE DONNER TENTS WERE AT THE HEAD OF ALDER CREEK. NINETY PEOPLE WERE IN THE PARTY AND FORTY-TWO PERISHED, MOST OF THEM FROM STARVATION AND EXPOSURE.IN COMMEMORATION OF THE PIONEERS WHO CROSSED THE PLAINS TO SETTLE IN CALIFORNIA. MONUMENT ERECTED UNDER THE AUSPICES OF THE NATIVE SONS AND THE NATIVE DAUGHTERS OF THE GOLDEN WEST. MONUMENT DEDICATED JUNE 6, 1918

A plaque on the boulder's face reads: THE FACE OF THIS ROCK FORMED THE NORTH END AND THE FIREPLACE OF THE MURPHY CABIN. GENERAL STEPHEN W. KEARNY, ON JUNE 22, 1847, BURIED UNDER THE MIDDLE OF THE CABIN THE BODIES FOUND IN THE VICINITY. FOLLOWING IS A COMPLETE LIST OF THE MEMBERS OF THE DONNER PARTY WHO OCCUPIED THE VARIOUS CABINS AND TENTS. This is followed by a list of the members of the Donner Party, divided into "Survived" and "Perished." (Some of the information on this plaque is inaccurate, however.)

The Moses Schallenberger plaque reads:
SCHALLENBERGER CABIN SITE \ Near this spot stood a small cabin built by 18-year-old Moses Schallenberger and two other men. They were members of the Stephens-Townsend-Murphy Party of 1844, the first pioneers to take wagons over the Sierra Nevada, opening the Truckee Route of the California Trail. The three men had volunteered to remain behind and guard six of the wagons left here by the main party. \ Due to extreme winter weather conditions and lack of food, the three men agreed to separate. The two older men rejoined the wagon party, but due to his weakened physical condition, Moses Schallenberger chose to remain at the cabin. The young man survived for nearly three months alone in the small cabin during the winter of 1844–45 before being rescued. His cabin would later provide shelter for the Breen family, members of the ill-fated Donner Party, who were stranded here in 1846–47. \ The courage and resolution of Moses Schallenberger during his solitary winter ordeal in this cabin makes him one of the true heroes in the saga of the California Trail. \ Dedicated August 19, 1995 \ Nevada County Historical Landmarks Commission \ Calif. Dept. of Parks and Recreation \ Nev-01-95 \ This monument was made possible through the generosity of many groups and individuals committed to the preservation of the California Trail.

Climate
The park has either a Mediterranean climate or a humid continental climate (Köppen climate classification Dsb/Csb) with cold, snowy winters and warm, dry summers. Summers are dry with warm daytime temperatures (can exceed  on 6.3 days) and cold nighttime temperatures that often reach below .

See also
List of California state parks

References

External links
Donner Memorial State Park

State parks of California
Parks in Nevada County, California
Donner Party
History museums in California
Museums in Nevada County, California
California Historical Landmarks
National Historic Landmarks in California
National Register of Historic Places in Nevada County, California
History of Nevada County, California
Protected areas established in 1928
1928 establishments in California
Campgrounds in California
Protected areas of the Sierra Nevada (United States)
Temporary populated places on the National Register of Historic Places
Stephens–Townsend–Murphy Party